Julius Timothy is a politician from Dominica. He holds a MBA from the University of the West Indies and was president of the Dominica Association of Industry and Commerce. From June 1995 he has served as MP for the Roseau North Constituency and he served as Health Minister. He first became active in politics as a founding member of the United Workers' Party. He was Deputy Leader of the UWP from its inception until December 2005 and he was appointed Minister of Finance, Industry and Planning from June 1995 to February 2000 during the UWP-led administration. Following a leadership struggle after the May 5 2005 general elections, Timothy crossed the floor and became a member of the Dominica Labour Party.

References

Year of birth missing (living people)
Living people
United Workers' Party (Dominica) politicians
Dominica Labour Party politicians
Finance ministers of Dominica
Government ministers of Dominica
Members of the House of Assembly of Dominica
University of the West Indies alumni